Harvey Choun Lim (born 30 August 1967) is an English former professional footballer.

Playing career 
A goalkeeper, he was a youth player with Norwich City, but never played for the first team. After spells at Plymouth Argyle (on loan), Kettering Town and Friska Viljor in Sweden, Lim signed for Gillingham in November 1989 as cover for Ron Hillyard. He would go on to be named Player of the Year for 1990–91 and make over 100 first team appearances for the Kent side. After a loan spell at his old side Kettering Town in the Conference, Gillingham released Lim in May 1993. 

Lim then signed for Sing Tao of the Hong Kong First Division, in a move facilitated by Mike Trusson, who had made the move from Gillingham to Sing Tao in 1991. A serious neck injury sustained whole playing in Hong Kong forced Lim to retire from football at just 27 years old.

Lim held aspirations to play international football for China on the basis of his Fujian-born father, but was informed that he was not eligible upon moving to Hong Kong.

Personal life 
He subsequently moved to Whistler, British Columbia and opened an art gallery and picture framing studio.

References

1967 births
Living people
People from Halesworth
English footballers
Association football goalkeepers
Norwich City F.C. players
Plymouth Argyle F.C. players
Kettering Town F.C. players
Friska Viljor FC players
Gillingham F.C. players
Sing Tao SC players
English Football League players
Hong Kong First Division League players
English expatriate sportspeople in Sweden
Expatriate footballers in Sweden
Expatriate footballers in Hong Kong
English expatriate sportspeople in Hong Kong
English expatriate footballers